Requiem for Recycled Earth  is a studio album by American musician James Ferraro, released independently on May 3, 2019. The album is the first part of Ferraro's Four Pieces For Mirai series.

Background
Ferraro has described the album as a "opus into ecocide and planetary divorce".

Track listing

References

James Ferraro albums
2019 albums
Concept albums